Tiger Cubs (literally "flying tigers"), alternatively titled Special Duties Unit, is a Hong Kong police procedural television series produced by Lam Chi-wah and TVB. It stars Joe Ma , Jessica Hsuan , Him Law, Oscar Leung, Vincent Wong, Mandy Wong, Benjamin Yuen and William Chak as casts of the first installment. It premiered on Sunday, 24 June 2012 on Jade and HD Jade, and was the first TVB drama to broadcast in the Sunday night time slot since 1995's File of Justice. Tiger Cubs was one of six TVB dramas that were promoted at the 2011 Hong Kong Internal Film and TV Market. Tiger Cubs debuted its trailer at TVB's Programme Presentation 2012 event on 1 November 2011.

The drama was renewed for a sequel in early 2013 for ten episodes. Tiger Cubs II premiered on 19 October 2014.

Premise
The drama follows a fictional team of elite paramilitary officers from the Special Duties Unit of the Hong Kong police force. They specialise in counter-terrorism, hostage rescue, and crimes that are deemed too dangerous for regular police to handle. The unit works closely with the Organised Crime and Triad Bureau (OCTB) to crack down on terrorist groups.

Production
Written by Lee Yee-wah, Tiger Cubs began pre-production with the backing of the Hong Kong Police Force, which supported the drama with their newest SDU equipment. With a budget of over HK$15 million, each episode took HK$1 million to make, three times more expensive than an average TVB drama production. On 3 January 2011, it was announced that Joe Ma, a former VIPPU officer, and Jessica Hsuan had been cast in the lead roles. On 5 January, a press conference and costume fitting was held at TVB City, Tseung Kwan O. Filming commenced on 20 January and ended in April, taking four months to complete. To keep up with the demanding and flexible physical requirements of the drama, most of the main cast members consistently underwent special training between filming schedules. Him Law, who portrays SDU A-Team officer Yue Hok-lai, reported that he lost about 10 pounds after filming the first episode. On 10 February, guest star Ngo Ka-nin injured his right knee while filming a fight sequence with Dan Jun-wai, who injured his head. A TVB spokesperson later announced that they were both fine. Earlier, Savio Tsang, who portrays SDU A-Team sub leader Yip Shu-fai, was injured in the face by a plastic bullet, and Christine Kuo injured her head from a telephone booth.

Manila hostage crisis dramatisation
The production of Tiger Cubs was announced shortly after the Manila hostage crisis, causing the media to speculate if the incident had inspired the production of Tiger Cubs. Producer Lam Chi-wah denied the claims, saying that he had intentions to produce a drama about the SDU even before the crisis happened. On 30 March 2011, a tourist bus hostage scene inspired by the Manila hostage crisis was filming near Kai Tak Airport. The actors involved in the shoot admitted  afterwards that they rather not have filmed it, and guest star Kenneth Ma, who portrays the hijacker, said he was afraid the scene would tarnish his public image. Nonetheless, the cast and crew "did their job" and filmed a majority of the action sequence in the first two days. On 1 April, TVB executives decided to cancel the scene, stating that the plot was too sensitive and disturbing for the Hong Kong people. They re-filmed the hostage scene from hijacking a tourist bus to hijacking a boat.

Cast

Main characters
Joe Ma as Senior Inspector Chin Hon-to (展瀚韜), the strict head of SDU's alpha team.  
Jessica Hsuan as Senior Inspector Chong Chuk-wah (莊卓嬅), head of OCTB's A Division. She is suffering from depression due to the death of her fiancé.
Oscar Leung as Acting Sgt. Chong Chuk-yuen (莊卓源), alpha team's most experienced sniper and Wah's younger brother.
Him Law as Acting Sgt. Yu Hok-lai (俞學禮), a new member to SDU's alpha team who eventually becomes one of the team's main front line assaulters. Lai's overconfident and cocky attitude rises from his attempt to not fall victim to stereotypes due to his wealthy family background. Yuen is the only member of the team who calls Lai "Bob Jai" (Bob仔; literally "Kid Bob").   
Vincent Wong as Acting Sgt. Yau Chun-hin (邱駿軒), also a new member to SDU's alpha team and Lai's best friend. Hin's calm and patient personality eventually has him become one of the best snipers in the team. However, Hin lacks self-esteem, and is presented as a foil to Lai's bold and fearless character.
Mandy Wong as Probationary Inspector So Man-keung (蘇文強), alpha team's only female member and one of the main technicians for the team's administrative support. Keung suffers from acrophobia, which consistently impedes her from passing the SDU operation team exams.
William Chak as Acting Sgt. Cheung Kai-kwong (張繼光), one of alpha team's physically strongest members, but originally joined the unit so he can earn fast money to open his own fitness center.
Benjamin Yuen as Acting Sgt. Tse Kar-sing (謝家星), one of alpha team's main assaulters.

Supporting characters
Wu Kwing-lung as Bitch / Acting Sgt. Hui Chi-yan (許志仁), an A Team sniper.
Oscar Li as Ringmaster / Acting Sgt. Kwok Yiu-cho (郭耀祖), A Team's current leading front line assaulter.
Savio Tsang as Mother / Station Sergeant Yip Shu-fai (葉樹輝), A Team's sub-leader.
Raymond Tsang as Dragon Lady / Acting Sgt. Lung Kim-fai (龍劍飛), an A Team assaulter and is the team's oldest member.
Patrick Tang as Sergeant Ben Fong Wing-chaam (方永杉), a member of Wah's OCTB team.
Kayi Cheung as Constable May Fung Ka-mei (馮嘉美), a member of Wah's OCTB team.
Tong Chun-ming as Constable Lam Kwan (林坤), a member of Wah's OCTB team.
Jason Lam as Constable Law Siu-bor (羅小波), a member of Wah's OCTB team.
Christine Kuo as Ting Wai-wai (丁慧慧), a flight attendant and Yuen's love interest.

Special Duties Unit (SDU)

Organized Crime and Triad Bureau (OCTB)

Reception

Critical reception
The critical reception of Tiger Cubs has been generally positive. On Douban, the first series received a rating of 7.8 out of 10 based on over eleven thousand votes. Based on 87 reviews from Mtime, the first series received an overall rating of 7.5, with the critical consensus "it's worth to take a look."

Ratings
The following is a table that includes a list of the total ratings points based on television viewership. Tiger Cubs will be aired every Sunday for episode 1 - 3 and then twice a week on Saturday and Sunday afterwards.

Episode list

See also
Special Duties Unit

References

External links
Tiger Cubs at TVB Programmes
Tiger Cubs at Douban
Tiger Cubs at Mtime

 
TVB dramas
Hong Kong police procedural television series
Hong Kong television series
Hong Kong crime television series
Hong Kong action television series
2012 Hong Kong television series debuts
2012 Hong Kong television series endings
2010s Hong Kong television series